Deewana Main Deewana is a 2013 Indian Hindi-language romantic thriller comedy film starring Govinda, Priyanka Chopra, Kader Khan, Prem Chopra, Johnny Lever and Shakti Kapoor directed by K. C. Bokadia. The film was released worldwide on 1 February 2013. This film was shot approximately in 2003 but release was delayed for 10 years. The film is a Hindi remake of Tamil film Priyamudan (1998) starring Vijay, directed by Vincent Selva.

Plot
  
Basant is a guy who gets what he wants, sneakingly. He is friends with Vasant. At an antique shop, Basant and Vasant see an antique duck made of glass. Basant purposely drops to break it because the shopkeeper has reserved it for some one else. One day, Basant sees Priya and is head over heels in love with her. She proceeds to draw a smiley face on the glass frame. Basant tries to run after her but he spots her earring. Meanwhile Vasnat wants to enter a music competition but on the way their car hits a girl on a bike, which is Priya. She is in hospital and requires A1B blood. However Vasant is there (because the people who knocked her over took Vasant's car so he chased them) Vasant has the correct blood type and donates blood to save Priyas life. However this small event leads to the cancellation of the competition. Vasant is unaware the girl Basant boasts about is Priya the girl he knocked over. When Priya wants to contact Vasant to thank him for the blood donation, she unknowingly calls Basant but he doesn't know it is the girl he wants.

The next day, Basant and Vasant along with Satya and Prakash await the call but a music group calls insisting that Vasant must present himself there. Just after Vasant leaves, Priya calls, but says that Vasant must meet her at the Railway Station to Jodhpur. She is wearing a blue cap, has a blue top and is carrying an English novel. A call follows, and there is a problem with the boys so Vasant has to leave. When Basant sees it is the girl he wants, he plays a pretext he is Vasant instead. Basant goes home and finds his friend smoking and thinking about his guru because he is in hospital. One day, Priya calls Basant's (Vasant's) house but his mother picks up the phone. Her stupid sister blatantly says an old woman and the mother thinks they are referring to her, Basant takes the phone and speaks expletives unaware it is Priya. Vasant (the real one) goes for a music job, he has a cassette and meets Uncle ~Shakti Kapoor). He calls Priya to help him out. The plot thickens, when, just before Vasant goes for the interview Basant tells him to change his name to Ranjini Priya for good luck and he meets Priya. Both are unaware that Priya sees the boy who saved her life and Vasant donates blood to a girl he didn't know because he never see her.

At the movies, Basant (as Vasnant) goes with Priya but he sees the real Vasant (his real friend) talking to Priya. He oversees the conversation, gets angry and drops his ice creams. He says that he's not in the mood to watch the movie so they leave. Priya meets the guys at their home (Vasant's). Prakash calls Basant (who is Vasant to Priya) the boys find out Basant never told them about his girlfriend. One day Priya wants Basant (who is Vasant to her) to meet Ajit Singh, her father but he lies and says he's father is ill. The reason is because, when Ajit was pleading to save his daughter, Vasant shows up and says he'll be indebted to him. Basant realises he saw Vasant so when the father sees him he will know it is not the guy who donated blood. At the airport, Priya and Ajit are waiting for the flight but secretly Basnat sees them. He purposely procrastinates to delay time and rejects her calls. But when Ajit leaves Basant acts as if he reached late. Outside a guy pushes Priya, Basant starts to beat him. Another day Basant calls Priya but he doesn't speak. He overhears Priya is going shopping. Basant calls after that and her father picks up. He says that he's in Hotel Heritage Room no. 448. But he return to Priya's house only to pretend if Uncle is there. But then a cop shows up and proclaims that Ajit is dead. Priya is heartbroken.

Sharad Kuamr  investigates the case. He says Ajit was murdered. Sharad immediately knows that Basant is the killer. This leads to the place where Ajit died. Meanwhile Vasant shows up at Priyas house (the real one) and wants to meet Priya to say thank you. Basant goes to the hospital and tears the page with Priya's name on it. Vasnat sees this and they start arguing. Both go to some rocky terrain to talk. Vasant realises that Basant used his alias to win Priya's love. Basant gets angry and slaps Vasant. He loses his footing but Basant catches him. But he loses his hand and Vasant cascades to his doom. At the house of Basant Sharad arrives and he realises Vasant is Basant. Priya finds out too. She runs away. Basant chases after her and says it is true 'I killed your father' and his friend but it wasn't his intention. Priya takes a log and attack Basant. Priya nails herself with the log. Cops show up and Sharad shoots Basant. The earring that Basant possessed falls. He says it is evidence of his love. Priya bursts into tears. Basant is sent to jail for 7 years.

Cast
 Govinda as Basant Kumar 
 Priyanka Chopra as Priya Singh
 Nasirr Khan as Vasant Kumar / Ranjini Priya (music director)
 Kader Khan as Basant's father
 Himani Shivpuri as Basant's Mother
 Prem Chopra as Ajit Singh, Priya's father
 Johnny Lever as husband to a beautiful woman
 Shakti Kapoor as brother-in-law
 Sharat Saxena as Sharad Kumar
 Dipika Singh as Satya
 Mahaveer Kumar as Prakash
 Harsh Bokadia as the kid

Soundtrack
"Diwana Mai Diwana - Sukhwinder Singh, Shreya Ghoshal
"Judaa Na Honge Hum" - Sadhana Sargam, Udit Narayan
"Kala Doriya Kala Doriya" - Sudesh Bhosle, Ila Arun, Sunidhi Chauhan
"Ek Haseenaa Ek Deewana - Udit Narayan, Anuradha Paudwal
"Ek Rupaiya Deke" - Govinda, Bappi Lahiri, Ila Arun
"Panwa Pe Chuna Lagayenge (Remix)" - Vinod Rathod, Bappi Lahiri
"Panwa Pe Chunaa Lagayenge" - Vinod Rathod

Title and other changes

The film was suggested to have a title change as Pyar Jhukta Nahin but it did not materialise. The film was signed by Priyanka Chopra when she was 20 years old and this is very much visible in the movie. Although some scenes were filmed again, it didn't help much overall. Due to ill health, Kader Khan's dialogues were dubbed.

Critical reception
The Times of India gave the film 2.5 out of 5 stars saying "Lack of newness is a spoiler. You go to the theater, preparing yourself to sit through an 'old' film and thus, in spite of it being decently entertaining, it fails to grip your attention."

References

External links
 

Films scored by Bappi Lahiri
2013 films
2010s Hindi-language films
Indian romantic thriller films
Indian romantic comedy films
Films scored by Anand Raj Anand
Hindi remakes of Tamil films
Films directed by K. C. Bokadia
2013 romantic comedy films
2010s romantic thriller films
Films shot in Nepal